Johan Praem (13 October 1889 – 12 January 1967) was a Danish épée and foil rower and fencer. He competed as a rower at the 1912 Summer Olympics and as a fencer at the 1928 Summer Olympics.

References

1889 births
1967 deaths
Danish male épée fencers
Danish male rowers
Olympic fencers of Denmark
Olympic rowers of Denmark
Rowers at the 1912 Summer Olympics
Fencers at the 1928 Summer Olympics
Rowers from Copenhagen
Danish male foil fencers